The EWU–UM Governors Cup is the college football rivalry game between the University of Montana Grizzlies and the Eastern Washington University Eagles, both members of the Big Sky Conference in the Football Championship Subdivision (FCS).

History
The Governors Cup is a very intense and heated rivalry, with the winner often the eventual conference champion. The original Governors Cup game was between EWU and University of Idaho Vandals until they left the Big Sky Conference in 1997.

Since 2009, the game has sold out and its winner has advanced to the FCS playoffs. It is usually played in the mid-season in October, alternating between Roos Field and Washington–Grizzly Stadium. In the 1980s and from 1998 to 2002, EWU hosted the Montana game at Spokane's Joe Albi Stadium.

Montana leads in the overall rivalry with 28 wins, 18 losses, and a tie. The first seven meetings were held before 1951; Montana was a member of the Pacific Coast Conference through the 1949 season. Of the first seven games, two were played in eastern Washington, both at night: the 1947 game was in Spokane at Gonzaga Stadium, which was soon deemed unsafe, and the 1950 game was in Cheney. The 1948 game was Eastern's only win in the early series, played in Great Falls. Following the 1950 game, the teams did not meet for three decades, renewing the series in 1980.

Eastern joined the NCAA in 1978 in Division II, moved up to Division I-AA in 1984, and joined the Big Sky in 1987. The only one tie was in 1984, when it was a non-conference contest; the Big Sky introduced overtime for conference games in 1980.
 
Montana broke Eastern's four-game winning streak in 2015 with a lopsided 57–16 victory in Missoula. Eastern won 35–16 in 2016 for their fifth straight win over the Griz on the red turf in Cheney.

The Governor's Cup debuted  in 1984 and was originally between EWU and the University of Idaho Vandals of Moscow. Eastern pulled off a seven-point upset at Joe Albi Stadium in Spokane, with chief executives John Spellman and John Evans in attendance. Idaho's last year in the Big Sky was 1995 and the two played annually in mid-season through 1997; the non-conference series continued for two more years, in the season openers in early September. The game with Montana in October became the Governors Cup in 1998, and was played at Joe Albi.

As part of the scheduling of Big Sky Conference games, each school has traditionally played two opponents every year as a rival. Eastern's current rivals are Montana and Portland State, however, with the return of Idaho to the Big Sky Conference for football in 2018, that will change to the Vandals and Portland State, with Montana becoming Idaho's second rival. This change will begin in the 2018 season, meaning EWU will not play a regular season game versus Montana in 2018 for the first time since 1982, and the two teams will no longer be guaranteed to play each other on an annual basis.

Game results

Coaching records
Since 1980

Eastern Washington

Montana

 Only tie was in 1984; Big Sky enacted overtime for conference games in 1980; all Division I games went to overtime in 1996.
 Two games in 2014, regular season and FCS playoffs, both in Cheney and both won by Eastern
 No game in 1982 or 2018
 Eastern started conference play in 1987, and first Governors Cup against Montana was in 1998

Stadiums

Roos Field

With more than 2,000 bleacher seats added, record crowds of 11,702 in 2010 and 11,583 in 2006 attended the showdowns with Montana, the most recent match up in 2010 was won by the Eagles. The previous record before 2004 was 6,879 for the Eastern – Idaho game on Oct. 17, 1992, when temporary bleachers were employed in addition to the 5,000 permanent seats. The top 25 attendances at Roos Field have come since the early 1990s, including the top eight in the last three seasons.

In February 2010, Eastern Washington announced its plans to remove the natural turf at Woodward Field and replace it with red SprinTurf, making it the second Division I college football program to have a non-green playing surface (Boise State changed to a blue surface in 1986.)  On May 20, the university's board of trustees approved a name change to Roos Field, upon the successful completion of the project. All-pro offensive tackle Michael Roos donated a half million dollars to the project; a three-year starter for the Eagles, he was a second round selection in the 2005 NFL Draft.

Washington–Grizzly Stadium

The stadium is named after construction magnate Dennis Washington, a Montana business pioneer who donated $1 million to finance its construction in 1985. The stadium has been expanded three times since its opening in 1986, most recently in 2008 with an upper deck expansion of 2,000 seats on the east side.

The original capacity in 1986 was 12,500 permanent seats on the sidelines with open grass seating behind the end zones, an approximate capacity of 15,000. Permanent seating for the end zones increased the seating capacity to over 19,000 in 1995, and a 2008 expansion pushed it over 25,000.

Eastern's first game at the stadium was in 1988; previous games were at Dornblaser Field.

See also 
 List of NCAA college football rivalry games

References

Eastern Washington Eagles football
Montana Grizzlies football
Big Sky Conference rivalries
College football rivalries in the United States